Harry Volpe (born Onofrio Volpe, April 7, 1904 – January 16, 1995) was an early jazz guitarist and pioneering music publisher. Following the introduction and popularization of the guitar in jazz in the 1920s by Eddie Lang ‒ and prior to the world's introduction to the playing of Django Reinhardt and Charlie Christian ‒ Volpe was in the vanguard of leading early virtuoso jazz guitarists whose collective style became known as plectrum guitar marked by solo and duet jazz guitar compositions, and included Carl Kress, Dick McDonough, Al Valenti, and Frank Victor. Volpe is known for his early plectrum guitar duet recordings with Frank Victor in 1936, starting a music publishing company in the 1930s, playing with Django Reinhardt in 1946 in Reinhardt's first US visit, having a Harry Volpe Epiphone guitar introduced in 1955, and having a long career writing guitar instruction books.

Biography 
Volpe was born in Grotte, Sicily and began his musical career on clarinet, but switched to guitar at the age of 8. He would join his father, a talented accordion player, and grandfathers to serenade neighbors. At 14, he emigrated with his father to New York City, and following a bout of tuberculosis, was teaching in Manny's Music Studio at the age of 15 and playing banjo in a Barber Shop trio. By 1922, he was on the RKO circuit and in 1924 he joined the Ted Navarre band where he remained until 1932. In 1932 he was selected as the first guitarist of the Radio City Music Hall orchestra. In 1936, Volpe recorded duets with Frank Victor on the Decca label, was involved in the introduction of the Gretsch Synchromatic 400, and opened Volpe's Guitar Center which he operated until 1941. From 1941-1944 he worked with Paramount and RCA.

In 1946, while on tour with Duke Ellington in the US, Django Reinhardt visited and played with Harry Volpe. From the late 1940s into the early 1950s, Volpe continued living and performing in New York, but a separation from his wife and resulting legal issues prompted a move to southeast Florida in 1954. Until his death, Volpe continued to play and teach in the Miami-Dade area.

Singles

Discography 
 Around the World with Harry Volpe (1965)
 World Famous Guitarist (1987)

References

External links 

 Biography
 Harry Volpe with Django Reinhardt

1904 births
1995 deaths
American jazz guitarists
American male guitarists
Italian jazz guitarists
Italian male guitarists
Italian emigrants to the United States
Decca Records artists
20th-century American guitarists
20th-century American male musicians
American male jazz musicians